Twifo ntafrewaso is a town in the Central region of Ghana. The town is known for the twifo oil palm plantation(TOPP).  The school is a second cycle institution.

References

Populated places in the Central Region (Ghana)